Shaftesbury was a parliamentary constituency in Dorset. It returned two Members of Parliament to the House of Commons of the Parliament of the United Kingdom from 1295 until 1832 and one member until the constituency was abolished in 1885.

History

Boundaries and franchise before 1832
Shaftesbury was one of the towns summoned to send representatives to the Model Parliament of 1295, and thereafter was continuously represented (except during the temporary upheavals of the Commonwealth) until the 19th century. The constituency was a parliamentary borough, which until 1832 consisted of parts of three parishes in the town of Shaftesbury, a market town in Dorset. In the 17th century the Mayor and Corporation attempted to restrict the right to vote to themselves, but after a decision in 1697 the vote was exercised by all inhabitant householders paying scot and lot. Shaftesbury being a prosperous town this included the vast majority of households, and in 1831 when the borough contained only 474 houses, 400 separate properties were rated for scot and lot and 359 people voted in that year's election. The franchise was therefore in practice, for the period, a very liberal one.

Political character in the 18th century
Like many boroughs, Shaftesbury generally recognised the local landowner as its "patron", with the right to nominate both its MPs, but also expected this influence to be cemented with generous bribery, making electoral control of the substantial electorate an expensive business. In the mid 18th century the joint patrons were Lord Ilchester and The Earl of Shaftesbury, who generally agreed to nominate one member each rather than bringing about a contested election which would allow the voters scope to demand bribes. Ilchester, who as Stephen Fox had sat as the borough's MP for a number of years before being raised to the peerage, described it as "troublesome, expensive and corrupt".

The patrons were free to recoup their expenditure by selling the seats to suitable candidates (at that period perfectly legal) rather than giving them to family or friends, but avoiding an expensive contest meant they could pocket the proceeds rather than seeing them (illegally) passing into the pockets of the voters. Namier quotes from the papers of Prime Minister Newcastle to show that Sir Thomas Clavering paid £2000 for his seat at Shaftesbury in 1754, and that in 1761 Newcastle quoted the same sum as the likely price of a seat for Sir Gilbert Heathcote, but added that no other pocket borough would be any cheaper.

However, the agreement between the patrons to split the seats amicably merely caused the townsmen to encourage independent candidates to stand so as to ensure a contest, and from 1761 onwards there was generally at least one candidate competing against those backed by the patrons. There also developed the practice of extending bribes in the form of "loans", which would not be called in provided the voter voted as instructed.

The corrupt election of 1774
Over the years a number of election results were overturned because of corrupt or illegal practices by the victors, but that of 1774 was particularly notorious. At that election one candidate, Hans Winthrop Mortimer, stood independently of the established interests in the town and, having been easily defeated, petitioned to have the result overturned and produced copious evidence of corruption. Thomas Rumbold and Francis Sykes were both shown to have bribed at a rate of 20 guineas (£21) a man, the total spent amounting to several thousand pounds; worse, the magistrates of the town were implicated in distributing this largesse. The contemporary historian of abuses in the rotten boroughs, Thomas Oldfield, gave this account of the "very singular and very absurd contrivances" unsuccessfully used in the hope of preventing proof of involvement:
A person concealed under a ludicrous and fantastical disguise, and called by the name of Punch, was placed in a small apartment, and through a hole in the door delivered to the voters parcels, containing twenty guineas each: upon which they were conducted to another apartment in the same house, where they found another person called Punch's secretary, who required them to sign notes for the value received: these notes were made payable to an imaginary character, to whom was given the name of Glenbucket. Two of the witnesses swore that they had seen Punch through the hole in the door, and that they knew him to be Mr. Matthews, an alderman of the town...

The Commons Committee accepted the evidence before them, and not only declared Sykes and Rumbold not duly elected and Mortimer duly elected to one of the seats in their place, but ordered that Sykes, Rumbold, and a long list of other inhabitants of the town should be prosecuted by the Attorney General for bribery and perjury. A bill was also brought in to permanently deprive the guilty parties of their votes; however this was never passed, the prosecution never took place, and the Commons was eventually persuaded to reverse its condemnations of Sykes and Rumbold so that both were able to stand for the borough at the next general election. They did not escape penalty entirely, however, as Mortimer brought a civil suit for bribery against Sykes at Dorchester Assizes, and was awarded £11,000 in damages – which he used to buy houses in the town, increasing his own influence at future elections.

Bankruptcy and evictions
The combination of corruption at the election itself and the need to fight petitions against the result afterwards made Shaftesbury too expensive to be useful to Ilchester, and he sold most of his property in the town to Sykes, while the Earl of Shaftesbury, having failed to get his candidate elected in 1776, seems to have withdrawn from any active involvement. Meanwhile, Mortimer continued his acquisition of property in the town until he owned the majority of houses in the borough, but spent so much on this and on fighting elections that he ran through his substantial fortune and ended in a debtors' prison.

The majority interest in the borough then passed to the nabob Paul Benfield, who bought up Mortimer's properties cheaply when they were auctioned off to benefit his creditors. However, after twice being elected in expensive contests, Benfield too was bankrupted. Shaftesbury then passed through a number of hands until, on the eve of the Reform Act, the principal interest was that of Earl Grosvenor. His accession seems to have eliminated Shaftesbury's endemic bribery and converted it to a more secure pocket borough: when Edward Harbord was offered the seat in 1820 in token of Grosvenor's admiration for his stand over Peterloo, he described it as "a place where no questions are asked as to political principles, and no money required". However, Grosvenor opted for coercion rather than persuasion to enforce his will, and at the tumultuous election of 1830 threatened to evict any of his tenants who did not back his candidates. This won the day, although the anti-Grosvenor candidate promised to compensate any of his supporters who might be evicted, and the election ended in a riot. Grosvenor's agents then proceeded to issue notice to quit to the recalcitrant tenants, fuelling an even-more-vigorous (but still unsuccessful) opposition to his candidates at the 1831 election, even though both of his nominees were pro-Reform.

Effects of the Reform Act
In 1831, the population of the borough was 2,742, but the Reform Act of the following year extended the boundaries to include the whole of three town parishes and ten other adjoining parishes, covering an area several miles across and bringing the population up to 8,518. This was a bigger population than the revised borough of Poole, across the county, which kept both its MPs. Nevertheless, the Act provided that Shaftesbury lost one of its two MPs. The electorate of the new constituency was 634, and the reformed franchise being more restrictive than that which had previously operated, it was only the provision that preserved the rights of existing voters for life that prevented the new electorate from being as small as the old one. Indeed, as these voters died off or moved away the electorate fell still further, and only 461 men were registered to vote by 1865.

The constituency was unaltered in the boundary changes of 1868, but was too small to survive the next reform, and was abolished with effect from the 1885 general election. Shaftesbury itself and most of the borough were placed in the new Dorset North county constituency, though the parish of Donhead St Mary was in Wiltshire and was therefore incorporated into the Wilton constituency.

Members of Parliament

1295–1629

 Constituency created (1295)

1640–1832

1832–1885

Election results

Elections in the 1830s

Dugdale resigned, causing a by-election.

 On petition, Poulter was unseated in favour of Mathew

Elections in the 1840s

Howard succeeded to the peerage, becoming 2nd Earl of Effingham, causing a by-election.

Elections in the 1850s

Elections in the 1860s

Elections in the 1870s
Glyn succeeded to the peerage, becoming Lord Wolverton and causing a by-election.

Elections in the 1880s

Notes

References
Robert Beatson, A Chronological Register of Both Houses of Parliament (London: Longman, Hurst, Res & Orme, 1807) 
D Brunton & D H Pennington, Members of the Long Parliament (London: George Allen & Unwin, 1954)
 Michael Brock, The Great Reform Act (London: Hutchinson, 1973)
Cobbett's Parliamentary history of England, from the Norman Conquest in 1066 to the year 1803 (London: Thomas Hansard, 1808) 
F W S Craig, British Parliamentary Election Results 1832–1885 (2nd edition, Aldershot: Parliamentary Research Services, 1989)
 Maija Jansson (ed.), Proceedings in Parliament, 1614 (House of Commons) (Philadelphia: American Philosophical Society, 1988)
 J. E. Neale, The Elizabethan House of Commons (London: Jonathan Cape, 1949)
 T. H. B. Oldfield, The Representative History of Great Britain and Ireland (London: Baldwin, Cradock & Joy, 1816)
 J Holladay Philbin, Parliamentary Representation 1832 – England and Wales (New Haven: Yale University Press, 1965)
 Edward Porritt and Annie G Porritt, The Unreformed House of Commons (Cambridge University Press, 1903)
 Henry Stooks Smith, The Parliaments of England from 1715 to 1847, Volume 1 (London: Simpkin, Marshall & Co, 1844)  
 
 Frederic A Youngs, jr, Guide to the Local Administrative Units of England, Vol I (London: Royal Historical Society, 1979)

Parliamentary constituencies in Dorset (historic)
Constituencies of the Parliament of the United Kingdom disestablished in 1885
Rotten boroughs
Shaftesbury